The Saint Nicholas Society of the City of New York is a charitable organization in New York City of men who are descended from early inhabitants of the State of New York. Charles R. Mackenzie is the current president. The organization preserves historical and genealogical records of English-ruled New York and Dutch-ruled New Amsterdam. The society has helped preserve the oldest historically landmarked buildings in New York City. The Society is financing the digitization of its colonial historical archives to be made publicly available at the New-York Historical Society.

History
Washington Irving, with the financial backing of John Jacob Astor and other prominent New Yorkers, organized the society in 1835 for historical and social purposes. 

The group continues to hold regular dinners and meetings and to pay for newspaper announcements when one of their members dies. The annual dinner is usually addressed by notable speakers, with reports of speeches appearing in The New York Times.
One famous speaker every year for 179 years. In 1900 Mark Twain was an honored guest, he said "I find great improvement of the City of New York, some say it has improved because I have been away, Others and I agree with them, say it has improved because I have come back!" In 1852, Senator and Secretary of State Daniel Webster said, "Gentlemen, I deem it a great good fortune to pass a few minutes with you", "I am happy to be here", "I have raised my voice and swung my hat for forty years for Orange Boven." The colors of the society are orange and symbolic of the Dutch settlement of New York. The Society has held a spring dinner every year since 1848. The Paas Ball includes a presentation of Debutantes. The St Nicholas Society is part of a committee of organizations and governments planning to celebrate the 400th Anniversary of New Amsterdam settlement and the founding of the City that became New York.

Governance

The Society has several Officers including President, four Vice presidents, Secretary, Treasurer, historian, Genealogist, Assistant Genealogist, Chaplains, and Physicians. Members are appointed to a Board of Managers annually, and have three members for each Class or year who serve between a one and a five-year term.

Membership
Members are men descended from men who lived in the State of New York prior to 1785.

Notable members, speakers and award winners 
Speakers and award winners – Governors, Mayors, Presidents, Authors, and Philanthropists.  
 Mark Twain, author 
 Daniel Webster, U.S. Senator and Secretary of State 
 Theodore Roosevelt, president of the United States
 Henry Kissinger, U.S. Secretary of State
 John D. Rockefeller Jr., philanthropist  
 Fiorello LaGuardia, mayor of New York City
 John Lindsay, mayor of New York City
 Brooke Astor, philanthropist
 William S. Paley, founder of CBS
 Walter Cronkite, broadcaster 
 Tom Wolfe, author 
 David Rockefeller, philanthropist
 Thomas Watson Jr., philanthropist 
 Thomas Kean, governor
 David McCollough, author 2020
 Julian Fellowes, author, actor, producer, British Lord, screenwriter. 2022. 

Society members, past and present, include:
 Washington Irving, writer and founder of the Saint Nicholas Society of the City of New York.
 Chauncey Depew, United States Senator.
 William Watts Sherman, banker and socialite.
 Theodore Roosevelt, president of the United States.
 George Roe Van De Water
 Cornelius Vanderbilt II, president of the Society, owner of the New York Central Railroad and The Breakers
 Peter Gerard Stuyvesant, first president was the 2nd largest land owner in NYC. He owned the 60 acre Bowery family Stuyvesant farm which he developed into residential housing from Houston Street to 23rd Street. 
 John Jacob Astor, was also instrumental in the founding of the society.
 David Van Nostrand
 Pierre Lorillard IV
 Hamilton Fish, secretary of state
 George Goelet Kip

Medal of Merit Winners by Year 

References

External links

Organizations based in New York City
Organizations established in 1835
Lineage societies
Dutch-American history
Dutch-American culture in New York City
Ethnic fraternal orders in the United States